Sunnyside, also known as the Townsend Mikell House, is a historic plantation house located at Edisto Island, Charleston County, South Carolina. The main house was built about 1875, and is a -story, rectangular, frame, weatherboard-clad residence. It features a mansard roof topped by a cupola and one-story, hipped roof wraparound porch. Also on the property are the tabby foundation of a cotton gin; two small, rectangular, one-story, gable roof, weatherboard-clad outbuildings; a -story barn; and the Sunnyside Plantation Foreman's House. The Foreman's House is a two-story, weatherboard-clad, frame residence built about 1867.

It was listed on the National Register of Historic Places in 1986, with a boundary increase in 1994.

References

External links

Plantation houses in South Carolina
Historic American Buildings Survey in South Carolina
Houses on the National Register of Historic Places in South Carolina
Houses completed in 1875
Houses in Charleston County, South Carolina
National Register of Historic Places in Charleston County, South Carolina